The Maukhari dynasty (Gupta script: , Mau-kha-ri) was a post-Gupta dynasty who controlled the vast plains of Ganga-Yamuna for over six generations from their capital at Kannauj. They earlier served as vassals of the Guptas and later of Harsha's Vardhana dynasty. The Maukharis established their independence during the mid 6th century. The dynasty ruled over much of Uttar Pradesh and Magadha. Around 606 CE, a large area of their empire was reconquered by the Later Guptas. According to Hieun-Tsang, the territory may have been lost to King Shashanka of the Gauda Kingdom, who declared independence circa 600 AD.

Religion
The Maukharis were staunch Hindus. They tried to enforce and maintain the traditional social order among the people. Hinduism received state support, but Buddhism also managed to remain as a prominent religion.

Army
The Maukhari army consisted of elephants, cavalry and infantry. Ishanavarman in all probability would have taken much pains to reorganize the army and make it strong and worthy. The Maukhari strategy mainly focused on deploying elephant corps to crush the enemy armies. They were used against the Alchon Huns and the Later Gupta armies. The Maukharis fought against the remnants of the Alchon Huns in the areas of the Gangetic Doab and Magadha, as documented in the Aphsad inscription, while the Aulikaras repelled them in the Malwa region. The Aphsad inscription of Ādityasena mentions the military successes of kings of the Later Gupta dynasty against the Maukharis, themselves past victors of the Alchon Huns:

The Maukharis, rather than the Guptas, were therefore the key actors in repelling the Hunas.

Administration
Kannauj, the Maukhari capital, grew in prosperity and importance as a great cosmopolitan town. After the demise of the Maukharis, it even became the capital of Harsha. Hence, the Kannauj was largely contested by imperial powers.

The first three Maukhari kings are mentioned in the inscriptions as Maharaja, but their successors assumed more pompous titles showing the increase in power. Ishanavarman was the first Maukhari ruler to adopt the title Maharajadhiraja.

Cultural and international exchanges

The Maukhari kings were patrons of poets and writers and many literary works were composed during their reign. Various seals and inscriptions are known, such as the Asirgarh seal inscription of Sharvavarman, or the Haraha inscription of Isanavarman, discovered near the village of Harara in the Barabanki district, Uttar Pradesh and dated to Vikrama Samvat 610 (ie 554 CE), which record the genealogy of the Maukharis.

Contacts with the Sasanian Empire

With the end of Hunnic power, new contacts were established between India and the Sasanian Empire. Intellectual games such as chess and backgammon demonstrated and celebrated the diplomatic relationship between Khosrow I and a "great king of India." The vizier of the Indian king invented chess as a cheerful, playful challenge to King Khosrow. It seems that the Indian ruler who sent the game of chess to Khosrow was the Maukhari King Śarvavarman of Kannauj, between the beginning of Śarvavarman’s reign in 560/565 and the end of Khosrow's reign in 579. When the game was sent to Iran it came with a letter which read: "As your name is the King of Kings, all your emperorship over us connotes that your wise men should be wiser than ours. Either you send us an explanation of this game of chess or send revenue and tribute us." Khosrow's grand vizier successfully solved the riddle and figured out how to play chess. In response the wise vizier created the game backgammon and sent it to the Indian court with the same message. The Indian king was not able to solve the riddle and was forced to pay tribute.

Succession
The Vardhana dynasty (also called "Pushyabhuti dynasty") ultimately succeeded the Maukhari dynasty, but it had originally only been a small polity around their capital Sthaneshvara (Thanesar). According to Hans T. Bakker, their ruler Aditya-Vardhana (or Aditya-Sena) was probably a feudatory to the Maukhari ruler Sharvavarman. His successor Prabhakaravardhana may have also been a feudatory to the Maukhari king Avantivarman in his early days. Prabhakara's daughter Rajyashri married Avantivarman's son Grahavarman. As a result of this marriage, Prabhakara's political status increased significantly, and he assumed the imperial title Parama-bhattaraka Maharajadhiraja ("the one to whom the other kings bow because of his valour and affection").

Rulers 
The known Maukhari rulers of madhya-desha include:

 Harivarman
 Adityavarman
 Ishvaravarman (Iśvaravarman)
 Ishanavarman (Iśanavarman), r.c. 550–574 CE
 Sharvavarman (Śarvavarman), r. c. 574–586 CE
 Avantivarman
 Grahavarman, r. c. 600–605 CE

Barabar branch of Maukhari rulers

The Barabar Cave inscriptions attest the existence of another Maukhari branch. This branch ruled as feudatories, probably that of the Later Guptas. The known rulers of this branch include:

 Nrpa Shri Yajnavarman
 Nrpa Samantachudamani Shri Shardulavarman
 Anantavarman

See also

 Megasthenes
List of Hindu Empires and Dynasties

References

Bibliography

External links 
Joseph Schwartzberg. The Historical Atlas of South Asia.  Map of the “Age of Pusyabhutis & Calukyans, c. A.D. 550-700”. (Pg 26).

Empires and kingdoms of India
Dynasties of India
Former empires in Asia
States and territories established in the 6th century
Historical Hindu empires